Devi Prasad may refer to:

 Devi Prasad Shetty (born 1953), Indian philanthropist and a cardiac surgeon
 D. P. Tripathi (1952–2020), Indian politician
 Devi Prasad (artist) (1921–2011), Indian potter and painter
 Devi Sri Prasad (born 1979), Indian music composer (active since 1999)
 G. Deviprasad (born 1958), activist and politician